Songs to Grow On by Woody Guthrie, Sung by Jack Elliott is an album by American folk musician Ramblin' Jack Elliott, released in 1961. It consists of songs for children written or performed by Woody Guthrie.

Track listing

Side one
"Jig Along Home"
"Car Song"
"Swimmy Swim"
"Don't You Push Me Down"
"Why Oh Why"
"Put Your Finger in the Air"
"Wake Up"
"Pretty and Shiny-Oh"

Side two
"Clean-O"
"Pick It Up"
"Dance Around"
"How Dja Do"
"My Little Seed"
"Build a House"
"Needle Song"
"We All Work Together"

Personnel
Ramblin' Jack Elliott – vocals, guitar

References

External links
Ramblin' Jack Elliott Illustrated discography

1961 albums
Ramblin' Jack Elliott albums
Woody Guthrie tribute albums
Folkways Records albums